The Mnet Asian Music Award for Best Band Performance (베스트 밴드 퍼포먼스) is an award presented annually by CJ E&M Pictures (Mnet). It was first awarded at the 1st Mnet Asian Music Awards ceremony held in 1999; the band Jaurim won the award for their song "Fall", and it is given in honor for the band with the most artistic achievement in band performances in the music industry.

The category was originally named "Best Rock Performance" from 1999 to 2009. Since then, it has changed to "Best Band Performance".

Winners and nominees

 Each year is linked to the article about the Mnet Asian Music Awards held that year.

Multiple awards for Best Band Performance
As of 2021, eight (8) artists received the title two or more times.

Notes

References

External links
 Mnet Asian Music Awards official website

MAMA Awards